Villeneuve, LaVilleneuve or deVilleneuve may refer to:

People
 Villeneuve (surname)

Places

Australia
 Villeneuve, Queensland, a town in the Somerset Region

Canada
 Circuit Gilles Villeneuve, a Formula One racetrack in Montréal
 Villeneuve (electoral district), a former federal electoral district
 Villeneuve, Alberta
 Villeneuve Road

France

 Villeneuve, Ain, in the Ain département 
 Villeneuve, Alpes-de-Haute-Provence, in the  Alpes-de-Haute-Provence département 
 Villeneuve, Ariège, in the Ariège département 
 Villeneuve, Aveyron, in the Aveyron département 
 Villeneuve, Gironde, in the Gironde département 
 Villeneuve, Puy-de-Dôme, in the Puy-de-Dôme département
 Villeneuve-au-Chemin, in the Aube département 
 Villeneuve-d'Allier, in the Haute-Loire département 
 Villeneuve-d'Amont, in the Doubs département 
 Villeneuve-d'Ascq, in the Nord département 
 Villeneuve-d'Aval, in the Jura département 
 Villeneuve-de-Berg, in the Ardeche département 
 Villeneuve-de-Duras, in the Lot-et-Garonne département 
 Villeneuve-de-la-Raho, in the Pyrénées-Orientales département 
 Villeneuve-de-Marc, in the Isère département 
 Villeneuve-de-Marsan, in the Landes département 
 Villeneuve-d'Entraunes, in the Alpes-Maritimes département 
 Villeneuve-de-Rivière, in the Haute-Garonne  département 
 Villeneuve-d'Olmes, in the Ariège département 
 Villeneuve-du-Latou, in the Ariège département 
 Villeneuve-du-Paréage, in the Ariège département 
 Villeneuve-en-Montagne, in the Saône-et-Loire département 
 Villeneuve-Frouville, in the Loir-et-Cher département 
 Villeneuve-la-Comptal, in the Aude département 
 Villeneuve-la-Comtesse, in the Charente-Maritime département 
 Villeneuve-la-Dondagre, in the Yonne département 
 Villeneuve-la-Garenne, in the Hauts-de-Seine département
 Villeneuve-la-Guyard, in the Yonne département 
 Villeneuve-la-Lionne, in the Marne département 
 Villeneuve-l'Archevêque, in the Yonne département 
 Villeneuve-la-Rivière, in the Pyrénées-Orientales département 
 Villeneuve-le-Comte, in the Seine-et-Marne département 
 Villeneuve-Lécussan, in the Haute-Garonne département
 Villeneuve-le-Roi, in the Val-de-Marne département 
 Villeneuve-lès-Avignon, in the Gard département 
 Villeneuve-lès-Béziers, in the Hérault département 
 Villeneuve-les-Bordes, in the Seine-et-Marne département 
 Villeneuve-lès-Bouloc, in the Haute-Garonne département 
 Villeneuve-les-Cerfs, in the Puy-de-Dôme département 
 Villeneuve-lès-Charnod, in the Jura département 
 Villeneuve-les-Corbières, in the Aude département 
 Villeneuve-les-Genêts, in the Yonne département 
 Villeneuve-lès-Lavaur, in the Tarn département 
 Villeneuve-lès-Maguelone, in the Hérault département 
 Villeneuve-lès-Montréal, in the Aude département 
 Villeneuve-les-Sablons, in the Oise département 
 Villeneuve-Loubet, in the Alpes-Maritimes département 
 Villeneuve-Minervois, in the Aude département 
 Villeneuve-Renneville-Chevigny, in the Marne département 
 Villeneuve-Saint-Denis, in the Seine-et-Marne département 
 Villeneuve-Saint-Georges, in the Val-de-Marne département 
 Villeneuve-Saint-Germain, in the Aisne département 
 Villeneuve-Saint-Nicolas, in the Eure-et-Loir département 
 Villeneuve-Saint-Salves, in the Yonne département
 Villeneuve-Saint-Vistre-et-Villevotte, in the Marne département 
 Villeneuve-sous-Charigny, in the Côte-d'Or département 
 Villeneuve-sous-Dammartin, in the Seine-et-Marne département 
 Villeneuve-sous-Pymont, in the Jura (département)|Jura département 
 Villeneuve-sur-Allier, in the Allier département 
 Villeneuve-sur-Auvers, in the Essonne département
 Villeneuve-sur-Bellot, in the Seine-et-Marne département 
 Villeneuve-sur-Cher, in the Cher département 
 Villeneuve-sur-Conie, in the Loiret département
 Villeneuve-sur-Fère, in the Aisne département 
 Villeneuve-sur-Lot, in the Lot-et-Garonne département 
 Villeneuve-sur-Verberie, in the Oise département 
 Villeneuve-sur-Vère, in the Tarn département 
 Villeneuve-sur-Yonne, in the Yonne département 
 Villeneuve-Tolosane, in the Haute-Garonne département
 La Villeneuve, Creuse, in the Creuse département 
 La Villeneuve, Saône-et-Loire, in the Saône-et-Loire département 
 La Villeneuve-au-Châtelot, in the Aube département 
 La Villeneuve-au-Chêne, in the Aube département 
 La Villeneuve-Bellenoye-et-la-Maize, in the  Haute-Saône département 
 La Villeneuve-en-Chevrie, in the Yvelines département 
 La Villeneuve-lès-Charleville, in the Marne département 
 La Villeneuve-les-Convers, in the Côte-d'Or département 
 La Villeneuve-sous-Thury, in the Oise département
 Lavilleneuve in the Haute-Marne département
 Lavilleneuve-aux-Fresnes in the Haute-Marne département
 Lavilleneuve-au-Roi in the Haute-Marne département

Italy
 Villeneuve, Aosta Valley

Switzerland
 Villeneuve, Fribourg
 Villeneuve, Vaud

Other uses
 Villeneuve-les-Vertus Aerodrome, a WWI airfield near Vertus, Marne, France

See also
 Villenave
 Villanova (disambiguation)
 Villanueva (disambiguation)
 Hiriberri/Villanueva de Aezkoa